James Herbert Alexander Lyske (7 October 1932 – 11 or 12 December 1974) was a Northern Irish footballer who played as a full back in the Irish Football League for Glenavon, in the English Football League for Darlington, and for Southern League club Yeovil Town. He was on the books of Sunderland without playing for them in the League.

Lyske played four times for Ireland Schools in 1947 and represented Northern Ireland youth in 1951.

Lyske died in Yeovil District Hospital in December 1974 after collapsing in the street; he was 42.

References

1932 births
1974 deaths
People from Portadown
Association footballers from Northern Ireland
Northern Ireland youth international footballers
Association football fullbacks
Glenavon F.C. players
Sunderland A.F.C. players
Darlington F.C. players
Yeovil Town F.C. players
NIFL Premiership players
English Football League players
Date of death missing